The Metrication Ordinance was enacted in 1976 in Hong Kong. The law allowed a gradual replacement of the Imperial units and Chinese units of measurement in favour of the International System of Units Metric System. The adoption was facilitated under the government's Metrication Committee.

Decades after the enactment of the law, Hong Kong still has not yet fully completed the metrication process. Wet markets continue to use Chinese or imperial units to this day.

References

1976 in law
Hong Kong legislation